FabricLive.60 is a 2011 DJ mix album by Brodinski. The album was released as part of the FabricLive Mix Series.

Track listing
  Bicep - Silk - Throne Of Blood
  Low Jack - Slow Dance - unreleased
  Tomas Barfod - Beach Party - FOF
  Harkin & Raney - Workin & Steamin - Throne Of Blood
  Clement Meyer - Fire In Vitro - Correspondant
  Axel Boman - Purple Drank - Pampa
  Woodkid - Iron (Gucci Vump Remix) - Green United Music
  Renaissance Man - Stalker Humanoid - Turbo
  T. Williams - Heartbeat (Paul Woolford Remix) - Local Action
  John Roman - Petrified - unreleased
  TWR72 - Paradox - Sound Pellegrino
  Sian - Tropical Sci Fi (Sam Paganini Remix) - Octopus
  Samuel L. Session feat. Paris The Black Fu - Hype-Nosis - Detelefunk
  Rejected - For The People (DVS1 For No One Mix) - Rejected
  Sigha - HF029A1 - Hotflush
  Samuel L. Session - The Soloist (Reboot Remix) - Be As One
  Gingy & Bordello - Body Acid (KiNK's On Acid Remix) - Twin Turbo
  Gesaffelstein - Control Movement - Bromance
  Switch feat. Andrea Martin - I Still Love You - Dubsided
  Instra:mental - Pyramid - 3024
  Glass Figure - Brightside Of House - Satellite Of Love
  Riton feat. Shani Cuppcake - Dark Place - Ritontime
  Objekt - CLK Recovery - Objekt

References

External links
Fabric: FabricLive.60

Fabric (club) albums
2011 compilation albums